Tube-dwelling anemones or ceriantharians look very similar to sea anemones but belong to an entirely different class of anthozoans. They are solitary, living buried in soft sediments.  Tube anemones live inside and can withdraw into tubes, which are composed of a fibrous material made from secreted mucus and threads of nematocyst-like organelles known as ptychocysts. Within the tubes of these ceriantharians, more than one polyp is present, which is an exceptional trait because species that create tube systems usually contain only one polyp per tube. Ceriantharians were formerly classified in the taxon Ceriantipatharia along with the black corals but have since been moved to their own class, Ceriantharia.

Ceriantharians have a crown of tentacles that are composed of two whorls of distinctly different sized tentacles. The outer whorl consists of large tentacles that extend outwards. These tentacles taper to points and are mostly used in food capture and defence.  The smaller inner tentacles are held more erect than the larger lateral tentacles and are used for food manipulation and ingestion.

A few species such as Anactinia pelagica are pelagic and are not attached to the bottom; instead, they have a gas chamber within the pedal disc, allowing them to float upside down near the surface of the water.

Taxonomy
Order Spirularia
 Family Botrucnidiferidae Carlgren, 1912
 Genus Angianthula Leloup, 1964
 Genus Atractanthula Leloup, 1964
 Genus Botruanthus McMurrich, 1910
 Genus Botrucnidiata Leloup, 1932
 Genus Botrucnidifer Carlgren, 1912
 Genus Calpanthula van Beneden, 1897
 Genus Cerianthula Beneden, 1898
 Genus Gymnanthula Leloup, 1964
 Genus Hensenanthula van Beneden, 1897
 Genus Ovanthula van Beneden, 1897
 Genus Sphaeranthula Leloup, 1955
 Family Cerianthidae Milne-Edwards & Haime, 1852
 Genus Anthoactis Leloup, 1932
 Genus Apiactis van Beneden, 1897
 Genus Bursanthus Leloup, 1968
 Genus Ceriantheomorphe Carlgren, 1931
 Genus Ceriantheopsis Carlgren, 1912
 Genus Cerianthus Delle Chiaje, 1830
 Genus Engodactylactis Leloup, 1942
 Genus Isodactylactis Carlgren, 1924
 Genus Nautanthus Leloup, 1964
 Genus Pachycerianthus Roule, 1904
 Genus Paradactylactis Carlgren, 1924
 Genus Parovactis Leloup, 1964
 Genus Peponactis van Beneden, 1897
 Genus Plesiodactylactis Leloup, 1942
 Genus Sacculactis Leloup, 1964
 Genus Solasteractis van Beneden, 1897
 Genus Synarachnactis Carlgren, 1924
 Genus Syndactylactis Carlgren, 1924
 Genus Trichactis Leloup, 1964
Order Penicillaria
 Family Arachnactidae McMurrich, 1910
 Genus Anactinia Annandale, 1909
 Genus Arachnactis Sars, 1846
 Genus Arachnanthus Carlgren, 1912
 Genus Dactylactis van Beneden, 1897
 Genus Isapiactis Carlgren, 1924
 Genus Isarachnactis Carlgren, 1924
 Genus Isarachnanthus Carlgren, 1924
 Genus Isovactis
 Genus Ovactis
 Genus Paranactinia

A 2020 integrative study incorporating molecular phylogenetic reconstructions and morphological assessment across the three families recovered Arachnactidae as a well-supported clade, but did not recover Cerianthidae and Botrucnidiferidae as monophyletic, drawing into question the validity of the Spirularia suborder

References

External links

 Photos of Tube Anemones
 Tube-dwelling anemone toxins have pharmacological potential, mapping study shows, on: Eurekalert!, 29 October 2020. Source: Fundação de Amparo à Pesquisa do Estado de São Paulo

 
Anthozoa
Animal classes